West Island is an island within the Lacepede Islands group, which sits about 30 kilometres (20 mi) off the coast of the Dampier Peninsula in north-west Western Australia. It is located at 16° 51' S 122° 06' E.  It forms part of the Lacepede Islands Important Bird Area (IBA), so identified by BirdLife International because of its importance for breeding seabirds.

References

Lacepede Islands
Important Bird Areas of Western Australia
Islands of the Kimberley (Western Australia)